The 2013–14 Euro Hockey Tour is the 18th season of Euro Hockey Tour. It started on 29 August 2013 and will end on 4 May 2014. A total of 24 games will be played, with each team playing 12 games. The season consists of the Karjala Tournament, the Channel One Cup, the Oddset Hockey Games, and the Czech Hockey Games.

Total standings

GP: Games played; W: Wins; OTW: Overtime wins; OTL: Overtime losses; L: Losses in regulation time; GF: Goals forward; GA: Goals allowed; Pts: Points

Czech Hockey Games

The 2013 Czech Hockey Games was played between 29 August–1 September 2013, and was won by Finland. Five of the matches were played in Pardubice, Czech Republic and one in Saint Petersburg, Russia.

Karjala Tournament

The 2013 Karjala Tournament was played between 7–10 November 2013, and was won by Finland. Five of the matches were played in Helsinki, Finland, and one match in Gävle, Sweden.

Channel One Cup

The 2013 Channel One Cup was played between 19–22 December 2013, and was won by Czech Republic. Five of the matches were played in Sochi, Russia, and one match in Prague, Czech Republic.

Oddset Hockey Games

The 2014 Oddset Hockey Games was played between 1–4 May 2014, and was won by Finland. Five of the matches were played in Stockholm, Sweden, and one match in Helsinki, Finland.

Statistics

Scoring leaders
List shows the top skaters sorted by points, then goals. If the list exceeds 10 skaters because of a tie in points, all of the tied skaters are shown.
GP = Games played; G = Goals; A = Assists; Pts = Points; PIM = Penalties in minutes; POS = Position  positions: F = Forward; RW = Right winger; LW = Left winger; C = Centre; D = DefencemanSource:

Leading goaltenders
Only the top five goaltenders, based on save percentage, who have played 40% of their team's minutes, are included in this list.
TOI = Time on ice (minutes:seconds); SA = Shots against; GA = Goals against; GAA = Goals against average; Sv% = Save percentage; SO = Shutouts
Source: [Source] 
Updated: (UTC)

Rosters
These tables shows all skaters and goaltenders who have at least one game in the 2013–14 Euro Hockey Tour. The tables show how many games they played, how many points they've scored, and their penalties in minutes.
POS = Position; GP = Games played; G = Goals; A = Assists; Pts = Points; PIM = Penalties In Minutes
Source: [source link] 
Updated: (UTC)

Czech Republic

Finland

Russia

Sweden

References

 
Euro Hockey Tour
2013–14 in European ice hockey